Héctor Antonio Urrego Hurtado (born 10 November 1992), is a Colombian football player who plays as defender. He is currently free agent.

Club career

Santa Fe
Urrego plays for Santa Fé since his youth. He made his professional debut on June 14, 2012. He won two Liga Colombiana Finalizacion, a Liga Colombiana Apertura and a  Copa Sudamericana with the team.

Honours
Santa Fe
Categoría Primera A (1): 2014 Finalización
Copa Sudamericana (1): 2015
Superliga Colombiana (1): 2015
Suruga Bank Championship (1): 2016

References

External links

1992 births
Living people
Colombian footballers
Colombian expatriate footballers
Colombia international footballers
Independiente Santa Fe footballers
Independiente Medellín footballers
Curicó Unido footballers
Club Sol de América footballers
Categoría Primera A players
Chilean Primera División players
Paraguayan Primera División players
Association football defenders
Colombian expatriate sportspeople in Chile
Colombian expatriate sportspeople in Paraguay
Expatriate footballers in Chile
Expatriate footballers in Paraguay
People from Apartadó
Sportspeople from Antioquia Department
21st-century Colombian people